Abdul Qadir Halepota is a former judge of the High Court of Sindh and a member of the Law and Justice Commission of Pakistan. 
He was caretaker Chief Minister of Sindh province during the 2008 general elections.

References

Chief Ministers of Sindh
Judges of the Sindh High Court
Living people
Year of birth missing (living people)